Timothy J. Berry (born August 1, 1961) is an American politician who served as the State Auditor of Indiana from 2007 to 2013 and as State Treasurer of Indiana from 1999 to 2007. He resigned as State Auditor after being elected Chairman of the Indiana Republican Party on July 22, 2013. He left his post as State Party Chairman on April 30, 2015. He was replaced by Jeff Cardwell.

Education and early career
Born in Fort Wayne, Indiana, Berry graduated from Wayne High School in 1980. Berry received his Bachelor of Business Administration from Bowling Green State University, and his Master of Business Administration from the Indiana University School of Business.

Berry worked as an administrative assistant in the office of then-Fort Wayne Mayor Paul Helmke before workings as a financial officer for North American Van Lines.

Berry was elected Treasurer of Allen County, Indiana in 1990, being reelected to a total of two terms, serving in that position until 1999. During his time as Allen County Treasurer, Berry served as the President of the Indiana Association of County Treasurers in 1995.

State Treasurer
Berry served as state treasurer between 1999 and 2007.

State Auditor
He served in the position of Indiana State Auditor since January 1, 2007. He was re-elected in 2010 against Sam Locke by a large margin. He resigned the post effective August 13, 2013, after having become Chairman of the Indiana Republican Party.

Chairman of the Indiana Republican Party
He was elected as Chairman of the Indiana Republican on July 22, 2013. He was recommended for the post by Mike Pence on July 3, 2013. Under his leadership, Indiana Republicans swept the statewide races with an all-female ticket and expanded supermajorities in both chambers of the Statehouse in November 2014. The state's Republican incumbents also retained their seats in the U.S. House of Representatives. On March 12, 2015, Berry announced his resignation as State Party Chairman. He promised to serve until April 2015. He was replaced by Jeff Cardwell.

Personal life
Berry is married with two children and a member of the Trinity English Lutheran Church in Fort Wayne. He is a self described "hockey dad".

References

External links

Indiana Republicans
Indiana State Auditors
State treasurers of Indiana
Living people
Bowling Green State University alumni
Kelley School of Business alumni
Politicians from Fort Wayne, Indiana
1961 births
State political party chairs of Indiana
Republican National Committee members